Festival Cruises (known as First European Cruises in North America) was a Greece-based cruise line that operated between 1994 and 2004. It was founded in 1992 by the Greek entrepreneur George Poulides using second-hand ships. The company acquired three new-built ships between 1999 and 2002, but was forced to declare bankruptcy in 2004.

History
George Poulides founded Festival Cruises in 1992. The company begun operations in 1994 after purchasing  from Chandris Cruises. The following year the company acquired MS Starward from Norwegian Cruise Line, renaming her . A third second-hand ship followed in 1997, when MS Southern Cross was acquired from CTC Lines and renamed  for service with Festival.

Festival Cruises acquired their first newbuilt ship in 1999, when  was delivered from Chantiers de l'Atlantique in France. In 2000 Festival Cruises announced that the company would be merged into Peninsular and Oriental Steam Navigation Company (P&O), with the Festival Cruises brand being maintained under P&O ownership. The merger plan was abandoned later that year due to low value of cruise line shares at the time. Following delivery of the new ships the Bolero and Flamenco were chartered to other operators. Festival Cruises had an option for two more ships of the enlarged Mistral design, but the company decided not to use the option. Two more Mistral class ships were however built for MSC Cruises as MSC Lirica and MSC Opera.

Festival Cruises went bankrupt in early 2004, with all the company's ships were laid up and subsequently auctioned to other operators; European Stars and European Vision were sold to MSC Cruises, Mistral to a French investor group who chartered her to Iberojet, The Azur to Mano Maritime, Bolero to Abou Merhi Lines and Flamenco to Cruise Elysia.

Ships

References

Defunct cruise lines
Defunct shipping companies
Transport companies established in 1992
Transport companies disestablished in 2004
Shipping companies of Greece
Defunct transport companies of Greece
2004 disestablishments in Greece
Greek companies established in 1992